Monty Python's Complete Waste of Time is a collection of minigames, screensavers, desktop wallpaper and icons for Mac OS System 7 and Windows released in 1994 by 7th Level, Inc. It was brought on board the Mir Space Station by astronaut Andy Thomas.

Reception

In 1995, it won the Codie award for "Best Strategy Program" from the Software Publishers Association.

MacUser named Complete Waste of Time one of 1996's top 50 CD-ROMs, and gave it a score of 4.5 out of 5.

Sales
The game shipped more than 50,000 units worldwide by December 1994.

References

External links
 IGN: Mac PC

Review:Monty Python's Complete Waste of Time, by Erik Gos., 14 March 1998, Adventure Classic Gaming

1994 video games
Classic Mac OS games
Monty Python video games
Parody video games
Video games based on television series
Video games developed in the United States
Windows games
Single-player video games
7th Level games